William Wood (1827 – 30 August 1884) was a 19th-century New Zealand politician.

Biography

He was the third and last Superintendent of the Southland Province in 1869–1870. He was the first Mayor of Invercargill in 1871–1873.

He was a member of the New Zealand Legislative Council from 1878 until his death in 1884.

References

|-

|-

1827 births
1884 deaths
Members of the New Zealand House of Representatives
Members of the Otago Provincial Council
Members of the Southland Provincial Council
Superintendents of New Zealand provincial councils
Members of the New Zealand Legislative Council
Mayors of Invercargill
New Zealand MPs for South Island electorates
19th-century New Zealand politicians